The 1997 Arab Club Champions Cup edition, was won by Tunisian side Club Africain, the hosts. It was the 13th tournament and was held from 14 to 23 November 1997.

Preliminary round

Zone 1 (Gulf Area)

Kazma SC advanced to the final tournament.

Zone 2 (Red Sea)

Al Ahly and Al-Ahli advanced to the final tournament.

Zone 3 (North Africa)
Preliminary round tournament held in Sfax, Tunisia.

CS Sfaxien and WA Tlemcen advanced to the final tournament.

Zone 4 (East Region)

Al-Wehdat and Shabab Al-Am'ari advanced to the final tournament.

Final tournament

Group stage
The eight teams were drawn into two groups of four. Each group was played on one leg basis. The winners and runners-up of each group advanced to the semi-finals.

Group A

Group B

Knockout stage

Semi-finals

Final

Winners

Statistics

Goalscorers

Awards
Highest Scorer
 Maher (5 goals)

Man of the Competition
 Faouzi Rouissi

Best Goalkeeper
 Boubaker Zitouni

Fair Play team of the tournament

External links
12th Arab Club Champions Cup 1997 - rsssf.com

1997
1997 in African football
1997 in Asian football
International club association football competitions hosted by Tunisia
1997–98 in Tunisian football
1997–98 in Saudi Arabian football
1997–98 in Algerian football
1997–98 in Libyan football
1997–98 in Egyptian football
1997–98 in Kuwaiti football
1997 in Palestinian football